Raj Karan Singh is an Indian politician. He was elected to the Lok Sabha, the lower house of the Parliament of India from the Sultanpur, Uttar Pradesh as a member of the Indian National Congress.

References

External links
 Official biographical sketch in Parliament of India website

1936 births
India MPs 1984–1989
Lok Sabha members from Uttar Pradesh
Indian National Congress politicians from Uttar Pradesh
Living people